The Lone Ranger Rides Again is a 1939 American Republic serial. It was a sequel to Republic's 1938 serial The Lone Ranger, which had been highly successful, and the thirteenth of the sixty-six serials produced by Republic.

The serial was considered lost for a long time but copies, with Spanish subtitles, have since been found and re-issued.

Plot

Homesteaders moving into a valley in New Mexico are being attacked by the Black Raiders. The valley had been settled by rancher Craig Dolan, who does not want the new homesteaders to be there. His son, Bart, has taken matters into his own hands and formed the Black Raiders. The Lone Ranger attempts to aid the homesteaders but he is hampered by his having been framed for being part of the Raiders. In particular, Juan Vasquez believes that he killed his brother, although when this is disproven he becomes another of the Lone Ranger's partners. However, the Ranger is forced to remove the mask and operate under the name of "Bill Andrews" at times in order to successfully protect the homesteaders.

Cast
Main cast
 Robert Livingston as The Lone Ranger and undercover as homesteader Bill Andrews.  Avoiding the deliberate mystery of the radio show and the gradual revelation of the first serial, the Lone Ranger is clearly revealed as Bill Andrews from the start. Livingston replaced Lee Powell from the first serial.
 Chief Thundercloud as Tonto, the Lone Ranger's sidekick
 Silver Chief as Silver, the Lone Ranger's horse.  Silver Chief replaced Silver King, the horse in the original serial.
 Duncan Renaldo as Juan Vasquez, who originally believes the Lone Ranger killed his brother
 Jinx Falken as Sue Dolan
 Ralph Dunn as Bart Dolan, Craig Dolan's son, the villain and leader of the Black Raiders
 J. Farrell MacDonald as Craig Dolan

Supporting cast
 William Gould as Jed Scott
 Rex Lease as Evans
 Ted Mapes as Merritt, a settler
 Henry Otho as Pa Daniels
 John Beach as Hardin, one of the Black Raiders
 Glenn Strange as Thorne, one of the Black Raiders
 Stanley Blystone as Murdock, one of the Black Raiders
 Eddie Parker as Hank, one of the Black Raiders
 Al Taylor as Colt, one of the Black Raiders
 Carlton Young as Logan
 Forrest Taylor (uncredited) as Judge Miller

Additional cast
 Billy Bletcher as the (uncredited) voice of The Lone Ranger. Bletcher also voiced the Ranger in the previous serial.

Production
The Lone Ranger Rides Again was budgeted at $193,878 although the final negative cost was $213,997 (a $20,119, or 10.4%, overspend).  It was the most expensive Republic serial of 1939 and the second most expensive of all Republic serials after Captain America (1944, $222,906), just beating Secret Service in Darkest Africa (1943, $210,033).

The studio was willing to spend so much on this serial because the previous Lone Ranger serial had been a major success and was making a profit after only a few months on release.

It was filmed between 9 December 1938 and 20 January 1939 under the working title The Lone Ranger Returns.  The serial's production number was 895.

Director William Witney did not believe the script was as good as the original The Lone Ranger but for the first time the directors insisted on being part of the casting process for this serial.

Stunts
Yakima Canutt
Tommy Coats
George DeNormand
Ted Mapes
Eddie Parker
Post Park
David Sharpe
Ted Wells
Bud Wolfe
Bill Yrigoyen
Joe Yrigoyen

Release

Theatrical
The Lone Ranger Rides Again'''s official release date is 25 February 1939, although this is actually the date the seventh chapter was made available to film exchanges.

Chapter titles
The Lone Ranger Returns (28 min 54s)Masked Victory (16 min 43s)The Black Raiders Strike (16 min 45s)The Cavern of Doom (16 min 44s)Agents of Deceit (16 min 37s)The Trap (16 min 39s)Lone Ranger at Bay (16 min 42s)Ambush (16 min 40s)Wheels of Doom (16 min 44s)The Dangerous Captive (16 min 37Death Below (16 min 40s)Blazing Peril (16 min 41s) -- Re-Cap Chapter
Exposed (16 min 42s)Besieged (16 min 39s)Frontier Justice (16 min 45s)''

See also
List of film serials
List of film serials by studio

References

External links

The Lone Ranger serials at B-Westerns
The Lone Ranger Rides Again at Endeavor Comics

1939 films
1930s English-language films
1939 Western (genre) films
American black-and-white films
Films based on radio series
Lone Ranger films
Republic Pictures film serials
Films directed by William Witney
Films directed by John English
Films set in the 1860s
Films set in New Mexico
Films scored by William Lava
American Western (genre) films
1930s rediscovered films
Rediscovered American films
1930s American films